William Thomas Calman  (29 December 1871 – 29 September 1952) was a Scottish zoologist, specialising in the Crustacea. From 1927 to 1936 he was Keeper of Zoology at the British Museum (Natural History) (now the Natural History Museum).

Life

He was born in Dundee, the son of Thomas Calman, a music teacher, and Agnes Beatts Maclean.

He studied at the High School of Dundee.

In the scientific societies in Dundee, he met D'Arcy Thompson. He later became Thompson's lab boy, which allowed him to attend lectures at University College, Dundee for free. A. D. Peacock, one of Thompson's successors to the chair of Natural history at Dundee, believed this appointment came about following a letter sent by Calman in 1891 asking Thompson's advice as to applying for a post in Edinburgh. After his graduation with distinction in 1895, he took on a lecturership at the university, where he remained for eight years. When Thompson died, Calman, along with Douglas Young, wrote his obituary notice in the Royal Society of Edinburgh Yearbook.

He later worked at the Natural History Museum, where he was appointed assistant curator of Arachnida in 1904 (replacing Pocock), became assistant curator of Crustacea and Pycnogonida and Keeper of Zoology. In 1909, he wrote the Crustacea section in Lankester's Treatise on Zoology, where he introduced the superorders Eucarida, Peracarida and Hoplocarida as well as the concept of the caridoid facies, a hypothetical ancestral malacostracan. He wrote several of the entries about crustacea for the Encyclopædia Britannica Eleventh Edition. He also established the current division of the Branchiopoda into the four orders Anostraca, Notostraca, Conchostraca and Cladocera. He was elected a Fellow of the Royal Society in 1921, being the first graduate of the University of Dundee to be so. Calman retired to Tayport in 1936, but returned to teaching during the Second World War at Queen's College, Dundee and St Andrews. He was president of the Quekett Microscopical Club from 1926 to 1928, president of the Linnean Society from 1934 to 1937, and was awarded the Linnean Medal in 1946.

He was awarded CB in 1935. St Andrews University awarded him an honorary doctorate (LLD) in 1937.

He died in Coulsdon in Surrey on 29 September 1952.

Publications

The Life of Crustacae (1911)
The Classification of Animals (1949)

Taxa named by Calman
Taxa named by W. T. Calman include:

Acanthephyra faxoni Calman, 1939
Anaspidacea Calman, 1904
Anchicolurus occidentalis (Calman, 1912)
Anoplodactylus cribellatus Calman, 1923
Anthracocaris Calman, 1933
Aristaeomorpha woodmasoni Calman, 1925
Ascorhynchus extenuata (Calman, 1938)
Atyella brevirostris Calman, 1906a
Atyella longirostris Calman, 1906a
Atyella Calman, 1906a
Austropallene tibicina Calman, 1915
Austroraptus juvenilis Calman, 1915
Austroraptus praecox Calman, 1915
Bankia australis (Calman, 1920)
Bathycuma longicaudatum Calman, 1912
Bathycuma longirostre Calman, 1905
Bathypallenopsis annandalei (Calman, 1923)
Bathyzetes extenuata (Calman, 1938)
Bodotria parva Calman, 1907
Bodotria similis Calman, 1907
Bodotria sublevis Calman, 1907
Bresilia atlantica Calman, 1896
Bresilia Calman, 1896
Bresiliidae Calman, 1896
Bresilioidea Calman, 1896
Brevitalitrus hotulanus (Calman, 1912)
Callipallene pectinata (Calman, 1923)
Calocarcinus africanus Calman, 1909
Calocarcinus Calman, 1909
Campylaspis antarctica Calman, 1907
Campylaspis orientalis Calman, 1911
Campylaspis platyuropus Calman, 1911
Campylaspis rostrata Calman, 1905
Campylaspis spinosa Calman, 1906
Campylaspis vitrea Calman, 1906
Caridella cunningtoni Calman, 1906a
Caridella minuta Calman, 1906a
Caridella paski Calman, 1928
Caridella Calman, 1906a
Caridina indistincta indistincta Calman, 1926
Caridinides wilkinsi Calman, 1926
Caridinides Calman, 1926
Ceratocuma horridum Calman, 1905
Ceratocuma Calman, 1905
Ceratocumatidae Calman, 1905
Cilunculus sewelli Calman, 1938
Colossendeis drakei Calman, 1915
Colossendeis scotti Calman, 1915
Colossendeis wilsoni Calman, 1915
Colurostylis lemurum Calman, 1917
Colurostylis pseudocuma Calman, 1911
Colurostylis Calman, 1911
Cryptocnemus haddoni Calman, 1900
Cumella australis Calman, 1907
Cumella clavicauda Calman, 1911
Cumella forficula Calman, 1911
Cumella gracilima Calman, 1905
Cumella hispida Calman, 1911
Cumella laevis Calman, 1911
Cumella leptopus Calman, 1911
Cumella serrata Calman, 1911
Cumellopsis helgae Calman, 1905
Cumellopsis puritani Calman, 1906
Cumellopsis Calman, 1905
Cyclaspis cingulata Calman, 1907
Cyclaspis coelebs Calman, 1917
Cyclaspis costata Calman, 1904
Cyclaspis elegans Calman, 1907
Cyclaspis herdmani Calman, 1904
Cyclaspis hornelli Calman, 1904
Cyclaspis longipes Calman, 1907
Cyclaspis persculpta Calman, 1905
Cyclaspis picta Calman, 1904
Cyclaspis sibogae Calman, 1905
Cyclaspis similis Calman, 1907
Cyclaspis thomsoni Calman, 1907
Cyclaspis triplicata Calman, 1907
Cyclaspis unicornis Calman, 1907
Cyclaspis uniplicata Calman, 1907
Cyclaspis varians Calman, 1912
Diastylis alaskensis Calman, 1912
Diastylis argentata Calman, 1912
Diastylis aspera Calman, 1912
Diastylis bidentata Calman, 1912
Diastylis dalli Calman, 1912
Diastylis insularum (Calman, 1908)
Diastylis koreana Calman, 1911
Diastylis mawsoni Calman, 1918
Diastylis nucella Calman, 1912
Diastylis planifrons Calman, 1912
Diastylis sulcata Calman, 1912
Diastylopsis crassior Calman, 1911
Diastylopsis elongata Calman, 1911
Dipteropeltis hirundo Calman, 1912
Dodecolopoda mawsoni Calman & Gordon, 1933
Dodecolopoda Calman & Gordon, 1933
Ekleptostylis walkeri (Calman, 1907)
Endeis flaccida Calman, 1923
Eocuma affine Calman, 1904
Eocuma dollfusi Calman, 1907
Eocuma latum Calman, 1907
Eocuma longicorne Calman, 1907
Eocuma stelliferum Calman, 1907
Eocuma taprobanicum Calman, 1904
Eucarida Calman, 1904
Eudorella monodon Calman, 1912
Eudorella similis Calman, 1907
Eudorellopsis biplicata Calman, 1912
Eudorellopsis resima Calman, 1907
Gennadas capensis Calman, 1925
Gennadas gilchristi Calman, 1925
Gennadas gilchristi Calman, 1925
Glyphocrangon mabahissae Calman, 1939
Glyptelasma hamatum (Calman, 1919)
Gynodiastylis bicristata Calman, 1911
Gynodiastylis carinata Calman, 1911
Gynodiastylis costata Calman, 1911
Gynodiastylis Calman, 1911
Hemileucon comes Calman, 1907
Hemileucon uniplicatus Calman, 1907
Hemileucon Calman, 1907
Heteroleucon akaroensis Calman, 1907
Heteroleucon Calman, 1907
Heteromysoides cotti (Calman, 1932)
Holthuisana wollastoni (Calman, 1914)
Hoplocarida Calman, 1904
Hyastenus uncifer Calman, 1900
Lamprops beringi Calman, 1912
Leucon heterostylis Calman, 1907
Leucon siphonatus Calman, 1905
Lioxanthodes alcocki Calman, 1909
Lioxanthodes Calman, 1909
Litogynodiastylis laevis (Calman, 1911)
Litoscalpellum juddi (Calman, 1918)
Lophopilumnus cristipes (Calman, 1900)
Makrokylindrus cingulatus (Calman, 1905)
Makrokylindrus fistularis (Calman), 1911
Makrokylindrus tubulicauda (Calman, 1905)
Namlacium crepidatum (Calman, 1925)
Nannastacus agnatus Calman, 1911
Nannastacus brevicaudatus Calman, 1905
Nannastacus gibbosus Calman, 1911
Nannastacus gurneyi Calman, 1927
Nannastacus minor Calman, 1911
Nannastacus pardus Calman, 1905
Nannastacus reptans Calman, 1911
Nannastacus stebbingi Calman, 1904
Nannastacus tardus Calman, 1911
Nannastacus zimmeri Calman, 1911
Nebaliacea Calman, 1904
Nematobrachion boopis (Calman, 1905)
Nematobrachion Calman, 1905
Nymphon andamanense Calman, 1923
Nymphon arabicum Calman, 1938
Nymphon foxi Calman, 1927
Nymphon proximum Calman, 1915
Oxyurostylis smithi Calman, 1912
Oxyurostylis Calman, 1912
Pallenopsis alcocki Calman, 1923
Pandalina Calman, 1899
Paradiastylis brachyura Calman, 1904
Paradiastylis longipes Calman, 1905
Paradiastylis Calman, 1904
Paralamprops orbicularis (Calman, 1905)
Paraleucon suteri Calman, 1907
Paraleucon Calman, 1907
Paralimnoria andrewsi (Calman, 1910)
Parapallene challengeri Calman, 1937
Parapallene longipes Calman, 1938
Parapotamon spinescens (Calman, 1905)
Peracarida Calman, 1904
Periclimenaeus arabicus (Calman, 1939)
Periclimenaeus crassipes (Calman, 1939)
Pigrogromitus timsanus Calman, 1927
Pigrogromitus Calman, 1927
Platycuma holti Calman, 1905
Platycuma Calman, 1905
Plesionika minor Calman, 1939
Polycheria osborni Calman, 1898
Pontonides unciger Calman, 1939
Potamonautes warreni (Calman, 1918)
Procampylaspis bonnieri Calman, 1906
Propallene kempi (Calman, 1923)
Pseudione giardi Calman, 1898
Pseudodiastylis ferox Calman, 1905
Pseudodiastylis Calman, 1905
Pseudolambrus confragosus (Calman, 1900)
Pseudoleptocuma minus (Calman, 1912)
Pycnogonum africanum Calman, 1938
Rouxana ingrami (Calman, 1908)
Rouxana plana (Calman, 1914)
Scherocumella brachydactyla (Calman, 1905)
Scherocumella gurneyi (Calman, 1927)
Scherocumella lepturus Calman, 1911
Schizotrema bifrons Calman, 1911
Schizotrema depressum Calman, 1911
Schizotrema sordidum Calman, 1911
Schizotrema Calman, 1911
Seguapallene echinata (Calman, 1938)
Sesarma boulengeri Calman, 1920
Spinoserolis beddardi (Calman, 1920)
Squilla brasiliensis Calman, 1917
Styloptocuma gracillimum (Calman, 1905)
Sympodomma diomedeae (Calman), 1912
Sympodomma weberi (Calman, 1905)
Teloscalpellum ecaudatum (Calman, 1918)
Thaumastocheles japonicus Calman, 1913
Trachycaris Calman, 1906b
Trianguloscalpellum annandalei (Calman, 1918)
Tropichelura insulae (Calman, 1910)
Typhlocaris Calman, 1909
Typhlocaris galilea Calman, 1909
Vaunthompsonia arabica Calman, 1907
Zanclopus cephalodisci Calman, 1908
Zanclopus Calman, 1908
Zygosiphon mortenseni Calman, 1907
Zygosiphon Calman, 1907

References

External links
 
 

1871 births
1952 deaths
People from Dundee
People educated at the High School of Dundee
Alumni of the University of Dundee
Scottish zoologists
Employees of the Natural History Museum, London
Fellows of the Royal Society
Presidents of the Linnean Society of London
British carcinologists
Academics of the University of Dundee
Academics of the University of St Andrews
Scottish marine biologists
Fellows of the Royal Society of Edinburgh
Companions of the Order of the Bath